FC Zhlobin is a Belarusian football club based in Zhlobin, Gomel Oblast.

History
The team was founded in 1994 as Energiya Zhlobin. They played in Belarusian Second League for three seasons, and at the end of 1996 the club was folded.

In 2003 the club was reformed as Kommunalnik Zhlobin. In the same year they joined Belarusian Second League, where they have been playing ever since.

Kommunalnik showed some good results in their first five seasons. They were close to promotion in 2006 and 2007, but finished 4th both times. They also qualified for eighthfinals of 2007–08 Belarusian Cup. However, in early 2008 the financial problems struck the team. They withdrew from the cup and changed their name to the current FC Zhlobin. Their league results declined as they never finished above 10th place until 2013. After 2015 season the club withdrew from the Second League and currently participates in youth and regional competitions.

In 2020 the club rejoined Second League.

Name changes
1994: formed as Energiya Zhlobin
2003: reformed as Kommunalnik Zhlobin
2008: renamed to Zhlobin

Current squad
As of September 2022

References

External links

Association football clubs established in 1994
Association football clubs established in 2003
Association football clubs disestablished in 1996
Football clubs in Belarus
2003 establishments in Belarus